SM Suzhou is the first SM mall in Jiangsu Province, and the fifth China mall expansion of SM Prime Holdings in the country. It has  of retail space. It is owned and operated by SM Prime Holdings, under the management of Henry Sy, a Filipino-Chinese business tycoon. The mall was opened to the public on September 23, 2011.

See also
Other SM malls in China:
SM City Jinjiang
SM City Xiamen
SM City Chengdu
SM Lifestyle Center

Shopping malls in Suzhou
SM Prime
Wuzhong District